Lars Bakkerud (born 1 June 1971) is a retired Norwegian football midfielder and later manager.

After ending his professional career, he became player-manager of Norheimsund in 2007. He also took a 30% position as director of sports in Løv-Ham. By chance, these two teams faced each other in the 2007 Norwegian Football Cup. He resigned in Løv-Ham after the 2007 season.

In mid-2008 he was hired as player developed in his former club Helsingborg. After three and a half years he took the same role in Brann, only to embark on a manager career in Fredrikstad one year later. Both Lars Bakkerud and director of sports Joacim Jonsson soon found themselves on illness absence, opening for Håkon Wibe-Lund as caretaker manager. When Bakkerud still had not returned at the end of the season.

Ahead of the 2014 season he moved back to the Bergen district as director of sports in Os TF. In mid-2015 he relocated to his native Vestfold as manager of Ørn-Horten. After a bad start in the 2016 2. divisjon he resigned. In 2017 he was ready for FK Tønsberg, where he became player developer, director of sports and coach.

References

External links
 Lars Bakkerud Interview

1971 births
Living people
People from Larvik
Norwegian footballers
IF Fram Larvik players
SK Brann players
Panionios F.C. players
Helsingborgs IF players
Hønefoss BK players
SK Vard Haugesund players
Løv-Ham Fotball players
Eliteserien players
Super League Greece players
Allsvenskan players
Norwegian First Division players
Association football midfielders
Norwegian expatriate footballers
Expatriate footballers in Greece
Norwegian expatriate sportspeople in Greece
Expatriate footballers in Sweden
Norwegian expatriate sportspeople in Sweden
Norwegian football managers
Helsingborgs IF non-playing staff
SK Brann non-playing staff
Fredrikstad FK managers
Sportspeople from Vestfold og Telemark